The Essential Emerson, Lake & Palmer is a greatest hits album by British progressive rock band Emerson, Lake & Palmer, released in 2007.

Track listing

Disc 1

Disc 2

References

Emerson, Lake & Palmer compilation albums
2007 compilation albums
Albums produced by Greg Lake
Albums produced by Mark Mancina